Alex Anfanger is an American television writer, actor, and producer known for his roles in Burning Love, Cake, and Big Time in Hollywood, FL.

Filmography

Film

Television

References 

Year of birth missing (living people)
American television writers
American television producers
American male television actors
Living people
American male film actors
21st-century American male actors